Lake Wood (Subanen: Danaw) is a lake located in the province of Zamboanga del Sur in Mindanao island, southern Philippines.

References

External links
 Geographic data related to Lake Wood (Philippines) at OpenStreetMap

Wood
Landforms of Zamboanga del Sur